E. nigrum may refer to:
 Empetrum nigrum, the black crowberry, a plant species native to most northern areas of the northern hemisphere
 Epicoccum nigrum, a fungal plant pathogen species
 Etheostoma nigrum, the Johnny darter, a fish species